Rupert Blöch (15 June 1929 – 28 May 2006) was an Austrian sprinter. He competed in the men's 400 metres at the 1952 Summer Olympics.

References

1929 births
2006 deaths
Athletes (track and field) at the 1952 Summer Olympics
Austrian male sprinters
Olympic athletes of Austria
Place of birth missing